Richard A. Cohen (born 1952) is an American psychotherapist and author associated with the ex-gay movement. He is a co-founder of Positive Approaches to Healthy Sexuality (PATH), and the past director of the defunct (since 2015) International Healing Foundation.

Early life
Cohen was born into a Jewish family in Philadelphia. While attending Boston University, he became an evangelical Christian, and later joined the Unification Church. Cohen received a Bachelor of Fine Arts degree from Boston University and a Master of Arts degree in counseling psychology from Antioch University. 

In 1980, Cohen married Jae Sook, a South Korean woman, and in 1995, Cohen and his family left the Unification Church. 

During adolescence, Cohen reportedly spent "years in intensive psychiatric treatment unsuccessfully trying to become straight". Cohen identified as gay during his undergraduate years at Boston University. He sought counseling for his unwanted same-sex attractions. He says he has been heterosexual since 1987, to which he credits resolution of underlying issues.

Career
Cohen became publicly involved in the ex-gay movement in 1990, when he founded the International Healing Foundation (IHF), a nonprofit organization, to counsel those who experience unwanted same-sex attraction. IHF was dissolved in 2015. In 2003, Cohen co-founded Positive Approaches to Healthy Sexuality (PATH), which promotes "the individual's right of self-determination, and equality, tolerance and diversity for all views of sexuality and gender identity." Cohen has said, "If someone wants to live a gay life, that needs to be respected. If someone wants to resolve unwanted same-sex attraction, that too needs to be respected."

Expulsion from the ACA and critical response
Cohen maintains that gender orientation is a "human rights issue," and that the choice to either identify or seek change is an individual one, a position that has generated controversy. In 2002, Cohen was  expelled from the American Counseling Association (ACA). Opponents claimed that Cohen practiced a form of "conversion therapy," which has been associated with coercion and labelled unethical. Cohen and PATH have publicly rejected conversion therapy, while insisting that "change is possible" and advocating for "equality, tolerance and diversity for all views of sexuality and gender identity."

Noting that the ACA is a non-licensing trade organization, and that his expulsion was based upon a single complaint, Cohen did not appeal the ACA decision. He said that the action was based on his efforts in the ex-gay movement, specifically for the book Coming Out Straight. He called the ACA "a biased organization," and asked, "Why would I want to be in a totally gay-affirming club?"

In 2017, the ACA codified in writing a governing council motion that stated "promoting, conducting, engaging in, or referring for reparative therapy, conversion therapy, or sexual orientation change efforts is a significant and serious violation of the ACA's code of ethics."

Media appearances
Cohen was on Jimmy Kimmel Live! on June 28, 2006, and was a guest on The Rachel Maddow Show on December 8, 2009. Cohen was interviewed by Jason Jones on the March 19, 2007, episode of The Daily Show, and was on The Michelangelo Signorile Show on the Sirius radio network on April 17, 2010. Cohen has also appeared on Larry King Live, The O'Reilly Factor, and The Edge with Paula Zahn, as well as interviews on CNN and ABC News in Washington D.C.

Coverage by other figures 
Cohen was a major figure in Wayne Besen's book Anything but Straight, which documents Cohen's life, his early affairs with men, and his later involvement in the ex-gay movement.

Select bibliography
Cohen has several books published or re-published under his own PATH Press:

--- (2020). Healing Humanity: Time, Touch and Talk . Bowie, MD: PATH Press.

References

External links

 pathinfo.org co-founded by Cohen
 Richard Cohen featured on The Daily Show

1952 births
Living people
Ex-gay movement
People self-identified as ex-gay
Boston University alumni
Conversion therapy practitioners
American psychotherapists
Former Unificationists